Darragh Egan (born 5 February 1986) is an Irish hurling manager and former player who has managed the Wexford senior hurling team since 2021. He is a former player with club side Kiladangan and the Tipperary senior hurling team.

Playing career
Egan first came to prominence at club and underage levels with the Kiladangan club. He had just progressed onto the top adult team when the club won the All-Ireland Club Championship at intermediate level in 2005. He was sub-goalkeeper when Kiladangan beat Loughmore-Castleiney to win their inaugural County Senior Championship title in 2020. Egan first appeared on the inter-county scene as a member of the Tipperary minor team that won the Munster Minor Championship in 2003 before lining out in the 2006 All-Ireland under-21 final replay defeat by Kilkenny. By this stage he was also a member of the Tipperary senior hurling team after making his debut during the 2005 league. Egan maintained an association with the team for a decade and was a non-playing substitute for their 2010 All-Ireland Championship success. His other honours include two Munster Championship medals and a National Hurling League title.

Management career
In October 2018, Egan was named by new Tipperary manager Liam Sheedy as a coach of the Tipperary senior hurling team. His first season with the team ended with Tipperary beating Kilkenny in the 2019 All-Ireland final. After the management team stepped down after three seasons in charge, Egan was appointed manager of the Wexford senior hurling team in September 2021.

Personal life
Egan, his wife Sarah and mother Mary featured in an episode of RTÉ’s Room to Improve in 2016 following his inter-county retirement; by that stage, at the age of thirty, Egan was principal of Kiladangan national school.

Career statistics

Honours

Player
Kiladangan 
Tipperary Senior Hurling Championship: 2020
North Tipperary Senior Hurling Championship: 2008, 2013, 2015, 2016
All-Ireland Intermediate Club Hurling Championship: 2005
Munster Intermediate Club Hurling Championship: 2005
Tipperary Intermediate Hurling Championship: 2004

Tipperary
All-Ireland Senior Hurling Championship: 2010
Munster Senior Hurling Championship: 2008, 2015
National Hurling League: 2008
All-Ireland Intermediate Hurling Championship: 2013
Munster Intermediate Hurling Championship: 2013
Munster Under-21 Hurling Championship: 2006
Munster Minor Hurling Championship: 2003

Management
Tipperary
All-Ireland Senior Hurling Championship: 2019

References

External link
 Tipperary Player Profiles

1986 births
Living people
Heads of schools in Ireland
Hurling goalkeepers
Hurling managers
Kildangan hurlers (Tipperary)
Tipperary inter-county hurlers
University of Galway hurlers